Ibrahim Maliki (born July 15, 1981) is a Nigerien former swimmer, who specialized in sprint freestyle events. Maliki qualified for the men's 50 m freestyle at the 2004 Summer Olympics in Athens, without having an entry time. He challenged five other swimmers in heat one, including 16-year-old Emile Rony Bakale of Congo. He posted a lifetime best of 26.81 to earn a third spot by a 1.34-second margin behind winner Bakale. Maliki failed to advance into the semifinals, as he placed sixty-ninth overall out of 86 swimmers in the preliminaries.

References

1981 births
Living people
Nigerien male freestyle swimmers
Olympic swimmers of Niger
Swimmers at the 2004 Summer Olympics
21st-century Nigerien people